This is a list of poems by Emily Dickinson. In addition to the list of first lines which link to the poems' texts, the table notes each poem's publication in several of the most significant collections of Dickinson's poetry—the "manuscript books" created by Dickinson herself before her demise and published posthumously in 1981; the seven volumes of poetry published posthumously from 1890 to 1945; the cumulative collections of 1924, 1930, and 1937; and the scholarly editions of 1955 and 1998.

Important publications which are not represented in the table include the 10 poems published (anonymously) during Dickinson's lifetime; and editions of her letters, published from 1894 on, which include some poems within their texts. In all these cases, the poem itself occurs in the list, but these specific publications of the poem are not noted.

Key

Rows
A row in the table below is defined as any set of lines that is categorized either by Johnson (1955) or by Franklin (1998)—or, in the vast majority of cases, by both—as a poem written by Emily Dickinson. Johnson recognizes 1775 poems, and Franklin 1789; however each, in a handful of cases, categorizes as multiple poems lines which the other categorizes as a single poem. This mutual splitting results in a table of 1799 rows.

Columns
First Line:  Poems are alphabetized by their first line. Punctuation, capitalization and even wording of the first lines may vary depending on the edition of each poem's text used.
F/S: Position in Fascicles or Sets. Dickinson preserved about 2/3 of her poems in "manuscript books" or "packets" of two types. Fascicles are composed of sheets folded in half (yielding one signature of 2 leaves and 4 pages), laid on top of each other (not nested), and bound with string. Other poems are preserved in what R. W. Franklin calls Sets which are groups of folded signatures appropriate for, and possibly intended for, similar binding, but never actually bound. The code in the table below indicates "F" for fascicle or "S" for set, then the fascicle number 01-40 or set number 01-15, then the order of the 4-page signature (or occasionally unfolded 1-leaf 2-page sheet), finally the order of the poem within the fascicle or set. An asterisk indicates that this poem, or part of this poem, occurs elsewhere in the fascicles or sets but its subsequent occurrences are not noted. Thus "F01.03.016*" indicates the 16th poem within fascicle #1, which occurs on the 3rd signature or sheet bound in that fascicle; and that this poem (or part of it) also recurs elsewhere in the fascicles or sets.
1st: First publication of the poem within the Todd & Bianchi volumes of 1890-1945 (see References). This does not account for the handful of poems published during Emily Dickinson's lifetime, nor poems which first appeared within published letters.
1stS.P: Section and Poem number (both converted to Arabic numerals, and separated by a period) of the poem in its 1st publication as noted above. Poems in the volumes of 1929 and 1935 are not numbered, so page numbers are given in place of poem numbers. An asterisk indicates that this poem, or part of this poem, occurs elsewhere in the Todd & Bianchi volumes but its subsequent occurrences are not noted.
Collect: Section and Poem number (both converted to Arabic numerals, and separated by a period) in the Bianchi collections of 1924-1937 (see References).
J#: Number assigned by Thomas H. Johnson in his variorum edition of 1955. Numbering represents Johnson's judgment of chronology.
Fr#: Number assigned by R. W. Franklin in his variorum edition of 1998. Numbering represents Franklin's judgment of chronology.

Table

Notes

References

Todd & Bianchi volumes

Bianchi collections

Includes poems from volumes of 1890, 1891, 1896, and 1914, with some rearrangement and 3 additional poems.

Includes contents of 1924 collection, plus the 1929 volume.

Includes contents of 1930 collection, plus the 1935 volume.

Scholarly editions

 (3 volumes)

 (3 volumes)

 
Dickinson, Emily
Dickinson, Emily